Striped headstander may refer to the fish species:

Anostomus anostomus, the striped anostomus or striped anastomus
Abramites hypselonotus, the marbled headstander or high-backed headstander